Roberto Genta (1 March 1907 – 11 July 1985) was an Argentine sprinter. He competed in the men's 200 metres at the 1932 Summer Olympics.

References

1907 births
1985 deaths
Athletes (track and field) at the 1932 Summer Olympics
Argentine male sprinters
Olympic athletes of Argentina
Place of birth missing
20th-century Argentine people